Myopa rubida is a species of thick-headed flies in the family Conopidae.

References

External links

 

Conopidae
Articles created by Qbugbot